Sergey Yaromko ( (Syarhey Yaromka); ; born 7 April 1967) is a former Belarusian footballer (forward) and currently a coach. From June 2019 till December 2020 he was a head coach for Belarus national under-21 football team.

Playing career 
In his early career Yaromko played in Belarusian SSR league for Burevestnik Minsk, before leaving to play a few seasons in Central Asia and Poland.

He returned to Belarus in 1993 and immediately became one of the most prolific strikers of Belarusian Premier League. He scored 103 goals in 184 games between 1993 and 2000 and became a league top scorer twice (in 1995 and 1998). Despite this, he didn't have much of a career in Belarus national team, for which he only played once (friendly match against Poland in 1994).

He spent his last season before retirement in 2001 as a player-manager for SKAF Minsk in the Second League

Honours
MPKC Mozyr
Belarusian Premier League champion: 1996
Belarusian Cup winner: 1995–96

Individual
Belarusian Premier League top scorer: 1995, 1998

Manager career 
After one season with SKAF Minsk, Yaromko spent next few years studying for a manager. In 2005, he managed Smena Minsk and at the end of the year was appointed as a head coach of a new club FC Minsk, which took over Smena license. He left Minsk in 2009, after which he worked in Dinamo Minsk and SKVICH Minsk.

References

External links
 

1967 births
Living people
Footballers from Minsk
Belarusian footballers
Association football forwards
Belarus international footballers
Belarusian Premier League players
FC Ordabasy players
FC Alga Bishkek players
FC Belshina Bobruisk players
FC Fandok Bobruisk players
FC Slavia Mozyr players
FC Torpedo Minsk players
FC Belshina Bobruisk managers
Belarusian football managers
FC Minsk managers
FC SKVICH Minsk managers
FC Gorodeya managers